James H. Miller (August 29, 1843 – June 27, 1890) was an American politician who served as Speaker of the Illinois House of Representatives from 1889 to his death in 1890.

Biography
James H. Miller was born in Wyandot County, Ohio on August 29, 1843. His family came to Illinois in 1851, settling first in Winnebago County, and later in neighboring Ogle County. After his formal schooling, he moved to LaSalle County and taught for a school year before enlisting in the 14th Illinois Cavalry Regiment during the American Civil War. After being wounded during the war, he followed his family to Stark County, Illinois where he recovered in Toulon, Illinois and read law. In 1872, Miller was appointed the State's Attorney for Stark County and elected to the position later that year. He served for a single term. He also served as the Village Attorney for Toulon for a time.

Miller was elected as a Republican to the Illinois House of Representatives in 1884 and reelected in 1886. In 1888, he challenged George Hunt, the incumbent Illinois Attorney General, for the Republican nomination in that year's general election. He was defeated by Hunt, who would go on to win reelection. Miller was reelected to the Illinois House of Representatives in the 1888 general election. In 1889, Asa C. Matthews was appointed Comptroller of the Treasury by President Benjamin Harrison. Matthews subsequently resigned from the legislature to take the position. In turn, the House elected Miller as speaker. In ill health, Miller died June 27, 1890, in Manitou Springs, Colorado while vacationing there as part of a recovery effort.

References

1843 births
1890 deaths
People from Wyandot County, Ohio
People from Toulon, Illinois
People from Ogle County, Illinois
People of Illinois in the American Civil War
Illinois lawyers
District attorneys in Illinois
Republican Party members of the Illinois House of Representatives
Speakers of the Illinois House of Representatives